Savarna is a genus of Southeast Asian cellar spiders that was first described by B. A. Huber in 2005.

Species
 it contains ten species, found only in Indonesia, Malaysia, and Thailand:
Savarna bannang – Yao & Li, 2020 – Thailand
Savarna chiangmai – Yao & Li, 2020 – Thailand
Savarna huahin – Yao & Li, 2020 – Thailand
Savarna kaeo – Huber, Petcharad & Bumrungsri, 2015 – Thailand
Savarna kraburiensis – Wongprom & Wiwatwitaya, 2015 – Thailand
Savarna miser – (Bristowe, 1952) – Malaysia, Indonesia (Sumatra)
Savarna satun – Yao & Li, 2020 – Thailand
Savarna tesselata – (Simon, 1901) – Thailand
Savarna thaleban – Huber, 2005 (type) – Thailand
Savarna thungsong – Yao & Li, 2020 – Thailand

See also
 List of Pholcidae species
 Forward caste

References

Araneomorphae genera
Pholcidae